This is a list of Northeast Conference men's basketball regular season first-place finishers, including ties.

Winners by school

Notes

References

Regular Season Champions